The IX Memorial of Hubert Jerzy Wagner was held in Poland from 26 to 28 August 2011. Like the previous edition, 4 teams participated in the tournament.

Qualification
All teams except the host must receive an invitation from the organizers.

Squads

Venue

Results
 All times are Central European Summer Time (UTC+02:00).

Final standing

Awards
 MVP:  Cristian Savani
 Best Scorer:  Maxim Mikhaylov
 Best Spiker:  Denis Biriukov
 Best Blocker:  Luigi Mastrangelo
 Best Server:  Aleksandr Volkov
 Best Setter:  Lukáš Ticháček
 Best Libero:  Andrea Giovi

References

External links
 Official website

Memorial of Hubert Jerzy Wagner
Memorial of Hubert Jerzy Wagner
Memorial of Hubert Jerzy Wagner